The following radio stations broadcast on FM frequency 88.5 MHz:

Argentina 
 Amiga in Rosario, Santa Fe
 Ciudad 88.5 in Bella Vista, Corrientes
 Fiesta 88.5 in 9 de Julio, Buenos Aires 
 FM Capital in Neuquén
 FM Municipal in El Calafate, Santa Cruz
 LRI716 Patria in Recreo, Santa Fe
 LRS945 Uno in Chabás, Santa Fe
 Nueva Argentina in Ituzaingo, Buenos Aires
 Radio María in Buenos Aires
 Radio María in Santa Elena, Entre Ríos
 Radio Pública in Mercedes, Buenos Aires

Australia
 2RRR in Sydney
 ABC Classic FM in Gold Coast, Queensland
 Radio VCA 88.5fm in City of Swan, Western Australia

Canada (Channel 203)
 CBAF-FM in Moncton, New Brunswick
 CBME-FM in Montreal, Quebec
 CBRO-FM in Christina Lake, British Columbia
 CBU-1-FM in Abbotsford, British Columbia
 CBVG-FM in Gaspe, Quebec
 CFIR-FM in Morley, Alberta
 CIBH-FM in Parksville, British Columbia
 CILV-FM in Ottawa, Ontario
 CIVL-FM in Abbotsford, British Columbia
 CJSR-FM in Edmonton, Alberta
 CKDX-FM in Newmarket, Ontario
 CKYL-FM-3 in Fairview, Alberta
 VF2074 in Burgeo, Newfoundland and Labrador
 VF2348 in Kattiniq, Quebec
 VF2384 in St. Norbert, Manitoba
 VF2506 in Fort St. James, British Columbia
 VF8005 in La Patrie, Quebec

China 
 CNR Music Radio in Chifeng
 CNR The Voice of China in Zhangjiajie
 CRI Hit FM in Guangzhou

Guatemala (Channel 2)
 TGRN-FM at Flores
 TGSG Galaxia La Picosa

Jamaica
 TBC Radio in Kingston

Malaysia 
 Nasional FM in Kuala Lumpur and Labuan
 Suria in Malacca and Northern Johor

Mexico
 XHAFQ-FM in Cosoleacaque, Veracruz
 XHCM-FM in Cuernavaca, Morelos
 XHCN-FM in Irapuato, Guanajuato
 XHCPBW-FM in Campeche, Campeche
 XHCRS-FM in San Luis Río Colorado, Sonora
 XHDI-FM in Chihuahua, Chihuahua
 XHFW-FM in Tampico, Tamaulipas
 XHIL-FM in Veracruz, Veracruz
 XHKT-FM in Tecate, Baja California
 XHKV-FM in Villahermosa, Tabasco
 XHPLEO-FM in Huajuapan de León, Oaxaca
 XHRRF-FM in Mérida (Conkal), Yucatán
 XHUSP-FM in San Luis Potosí, San Luis Potosí
 XHWAG-FM in Monterrey, Nuevo León
 XHZUM-FM in Zumpango, Estado de México

Nigeria

Palau
 T8BZ-FM at Koror

Philippines
 DXRJ in Cagayan de Oro

United Kingdom
 BBC Radio 2 in Barnstaple, Blaenavon, Bradford, Cwmafan, Firth of Clyde, Isle of Wight, Skye & Lochalsh, South Devon, Tyne and Wear

United States (Channel 203)
 KAIK (FM) in Rockaway Beach, Oregon
 KAKA (FM) in Salina, Kansas
  in Anchorage, Alaska
 KAKU-LP in Kahului, Hawaii
 KALA (FM) in Davenport, Iowa
 KARQ in San Luis Obispo, California
  in Oakridge, Oregon
 KAWF in Selma, California
  in Victoria, Texas
  in Mason City, Iowa
  in Minneapolis, Minnesota
  in Marble Falls, Texas
  in Independence, Kansas
  in Burley, Idaho
  in Grand Junction, Colorado
 KCKT in Crockett, Texas
  in Bemidji, Minnesota
  in Northridge, California
 KDPI in Ketchum, Idaho
 KEDC (FM) in Hearne, Texas
 KENG in Ruidoso, New Mexico
 KENU (FM) in Des Moines, New Mexico
 KEOM in Mesquite, Texas
  in Blythe, California
  in Belcourt, North Dakota
 KGHY in Beaumont, Texas
 KGNU-FM in Boulder, Colorado
 KHEW in Rocky Boy's Reservation, Montana
 KHIB in Bastrop, Texas
  in Victorville, California
  in Dubuque, Iowa
  in Adel, Iowa
 KJLJ in Scott City, Kansas
 KJNW in Kansas City, Missouri
 KKJJ in Diamond City, Arkansas
 KKRN in Bella Vista, California
 KLCQ in Durango, Colorado
  in Lincoln, Nebraska
 KLDX in Sioux Center, Iowa
 KLHV in Cotton Valley, Louisiana
  in Globe, Arizona
  in Klamath Falls, Oregon
 KLRF (FM) in Milton-Freewater, Oregon
 KLRW in San Angelo, Texas
 KMQX in Weatherford, Texas
  in Rolla, Missouri
 KMUZ in Turner, Oregon
 KNKO in Shageluk, Alaska
 KNKX in Tacoma, Washington
 KNPC in Hardin, Montana
 KNPJ in Greybull, Wyoming
  in Edinburg, Texas
 KOMQ in Omak, Washington
 KOYR in Yorktown, Arkansas
  in Junction City, Oregon
  in Mentmore, New Mexico
 KPMB (FM) in Plainview, Texas
 KPSC (FM) in Palm Springs, California
  in San Francisco, California
 KRFY in Ponderay, Idaho
  in Pullman, Washington
  in Steamboat Springs, Colorado
 KRSU (FM) in Appleton, Minnesota
 KSBA in Coos Bay, Oregon
  in Mission Viejo, California
 KSNH in Snowflake, Arizona
 KTEP in El Paso, Texas
  in Stigler, Oklahoma
 KTYC in Nashville, Arkansas
  in Ames, Iowa
 KUSK in Vernal, Utah
  in Laramie, Wyoming
 KUXO in Marfa, Texas
 KUXU in Monroe, Utah
 KVCC in Tucson, Arizona
 KVFE in Del Rio, Texas
 KVID in Mesquite, Nevada
 KVLT in Temple, Texas
 KVQI in Vail, Colorado
  in Laytonville, California
 KWLK in Westwood, California
 KWMV (FM) in Mountain View, Arkansas
 KWPU in Oskaloosa, Iowa
  in Redmond, Oregon
  in Bishop, California
 KYPH in Helena, Montana
 KYUA in Inyokern, California
  in Yakima, Washington
 KZTH in Piedmont, Oklahoma
 WAED in Lee, Illinois
 WAHP in Belton, South Carolina
 WAIB-LP in Redwood, New York
 WAMU in Washington, District of Columbia
 WANR in Brewster, New York
  in Cairo, Illinois
  in Mobile, Alabama
  in Morehead, Kentucky
 WBNH in Pekin, Illinois
 WCII in Spencer, New York
 WCOA-FM in Johnstown, Pennsylvania
  in Terre Haute, Indiana
 WCTP in Gagetown, Michigan
 WCUG in Lumpkin, Georgia
  in Stamford, Connecticut
 WEKC in Corbin, Kentucky
  in Saint Augustine, Florida
  in Charleston, South Carolina
  in Amherst, Massachusetts
  in Winston-Salem, North Carolina
  in Glenview, Illinois
 WGCA in Quincy, Illinois
 WGNC-FM in Constantine, Michigan
  in Milladore, Wisconsin
 WGRH in Hinckley, Minnesota
  in Allendale, Michigan
  in Bangor, Maine
  in Flossmoor, Illinois
 WHPK in Chicago, Illinois
 WHRG in Gloucester Point, Virginia
  in Hinsdale, Illinois
 WHYC in Swan Quarter, North Carolina
  in Mackinaw City, Michigan
 WJBE-FM in Five Points, Alabama
 WJFM in Baton Rouge, Louisiana
  in Guntersville, Alabama
  in Okolona, Kentucky
  in Virginia Beach, Virginia
  in Eagle, Michigan
  in Jackson, Mississippi
 WKEN in Kenton, Ohio
 WKHW in Halifax, Pennsylvania
  in Sunrise, Florida
 WKTH in Tullahoma, Tennessee
 WKUA in Moundville, Alabama
  in Syosset, New York
  in Birmingham, Alabama
 WLUZ in Levittown, Puerto Rico
 WMCE-FM in Erie, Pennsylvania
  in Florida City, Florida
 WMHY in Richfield Springs, New York
 WMNF in Tampa, Florida
 WMNK in Minooka, Illinois
 WMQS in Murphy, North Carolina
 WMUB in Oxford, Ohio
  in Columbus, Mississippi
  in Sussex, New Jersey
 WNMP in Marlinton, West Virginia
 WNPP in Cole, Indiana
  in Ontonagon, Michigan
 WPMW in Bayview, Massachusetts
  in Plainview, New York
 WPVM in Sturgeon Bay, Wisconsin
 WQJS in Clewiston, Florida
  in Memphis, Tennessee
 WRAS in Atlanta, Georgia
  in Wilkes-Barre, Pennsylvania
 WRKJ in Westbrook, Maine
 WRRS (FM) in Middleborough Center, Massachusetts
 WRTP in Roanoke Rapids, North Carolina
  in Rochester, New York
 WSDC (FM) in Sneedville, Tennessee
  in Sanford, Maine
 WSFI in Antioch, Illinois
 WSLT in Statesboro, Georgia
 WSSU in Superior, Wisconsin
 WTMK in Wanatah, Indiana
 WTTU in Cookeville, Tennessee
 WUFQ in Cross City, Florida
  in Hattiesburg, Mississippi
 WVBL in Bluefield, West Virginia
  in Gallatin, Tennessee
  in Valdosta, Georgia
  in Fairfield, Connecticut
  in Saint Johnsbury, Vermont
 WVPB in Charleston, West Virginia
  in Charlottesville, Virginia
 WWQS in Decatur, Tennessee
 WWRN in Rockport, Massachusetts
 WXPI in Jersey Shore, Pennsylvania
 WXPN in Philadelphia, Pennsylvania
  in Masontown, Pennsylvania
  in Cayce, South Carolina
 WYOR (FM) in Republic, Ohio
  in Wauseon, Ohio
  in Youngstown, Ohio
 WYVL in Youngsville, Pennsylvania
  in Scotts Hill, North Carolina
  in New Bern, North Carolina
 WZXX in Lawrenceburg, Tennessee

References

Lists of radio stations by frequency